Rotterdam Alexander is a combined metro and railway station in Rotterdam, Netherlands. It is located on the Utrecht–Rotterdam railway. It is named after Prins Alexander borough, and therefore indirectly after Alexander, Prince of Orange. Near the station is shopping mall Alexandrium situated.

Train services
The following services currently call at Rotterdam Alexander:
1x per hour intercity service Rotterdam – Utrecht – Amersfoort – Zwolle – Groningen
1x per hour intercity service Rotterdam – Utrecht – Amersfoort – Zwolle – Leeuwarden
2x per hour intercity service Rotterdam – Utrecht
2x per hour local service (sprinter) Rotterdam – Gouda – Gouda-Goverwelle – Woerden – Amsterdam – Uitgeest
2x per hour local service (sprinter) Rotterdam – Gouda – Gouda-Goverwelle (Peak hours only)

Metro service
Rotterdam Alexander station is also located on the Rotterdam Metro, a rapid transit system operated by RET. It is served by trains of lines A and B and is located on the former Caland line or east–west line.

See also
 Nederlandse Spoorwegen

References

External links
NS website 
Dutch Public Transport journey planner 
  NS station information

Alexander
Railway stations opened in 1968
Alexander
1968 establishments in the Netherlands
Railway stations in the Netherlands opened in the 20th century
Railway stations in the Netherlands opened in the 1960s